This is a list of Rocky Mountain passes on the Continental Divide of the Americas.

Major Passes

Note Column:A=Automobile road R=Railway E=Used by early explorers *=not strictly a mountain pass on continental divide, included for reference.

Passes including Trails

See also

 Rocky Mountains
 Canadian Rockies
 Central Rocky Mountains
 Western Rocky Mountains
 Southern Rocky Mountains
 Mountain pass
 List of mountain passes in Colorado
 List of mountain passes in Montana
 List of mountain passes in Wyoming
 List of passes of the Rocky Mountains
 List of railroad crossings of the Continental Divide of North America

References

External links

Great Divide of North America
Mountain passes of the Rockies
Rocky Mountains
Rocky Mountains